Sookuninga Nature Reserve is a nature reserve situated in south-western Estonia, in Pärnu County.

Sookuninga nature reserve is situated on the Latvian border of Estonia and comprises a large area of wetlands and woodlands. Sookuninga nature reserve and the Ziemeļu bogs protected area across the border together make out the North Livonian trans-boundary Ramsar protected wetland site. Together, the two sites form one of the largest natural peat bog areas in the Baltic states and constitute an important fresh-water reservoir. Sookuninga is home to many species, including large mammals like Gray wolf, Eurasian lynx and Brown bear. The site is furthermore a refuge for many unusual or threatened species of birds, including three species of eagle. Traditionally, the area has been sparsely populated due to its inaccessibility, and therefore also used as a hiding-place during times of war. Facilities for visitors include a bird-watching tower and a hiking trail.

See also
 Protected areas of Estonia
 List of protected areas of Estonia
 List of Ramsar sites in Estonia

References

Nature reserves in Estonia
Saarde Parish
Forests of Estonia
Ramsar sites in Estonia
Geography of Pärnu County
Tourist attractions in Pärnu County